Phạm Thị Hài (born 25 June 1989, Hanoi) is a Vietnamese rower. She has competed in 2012 Summer Olympics in the women's lightweight double sculls with Pham Thi Thao.  They were the first Vietnamese rowing team ever to qualify for the Olympic Games.

References

External links
 

1989 births
Living people
Vietnamese female rowers
Olympic rowers of Vietnam
Rowers at the 2012 Summer Olympics
Asian Games medalists in rowing
Rowers at the 2010 Asian Games
Rowers at the 2014 Asian Games
Asian Games silver medalists for Vietnam
Asian Games bronze medalists for Vietnam
Medalists at the 2010 Asian Games
Medalists at the 2014 Asian Games
Sportspeople from Hanoi
Southeast Asian Games gold medalists for Vietnam
Southeast Asian Games silver medalists for Vietnam
Southeast Asian Games bronze medalists for Vietnam
Southeast Asian Games medalists in rowing
Competitors at the 2013 Southeast Asian Games
21st-century Vietnamese women
20th-century Vietnamese women